Muhannad Yousuf Ozair (Arabic:مهند يوسف عزير) (born 18 February 1997) is an Emirati footballer. He currently plays as a forward, most recently for Shabab Al-Ahli.

Career

Al-Shabab
Muhannad Yousuf started his career at Al-Shabab and is a product of the Al-Shabab's youth system. On 10 February 2017, Muhannad Yousuf made his professional debut for Al-Shabab against Al Ahli in the Pro League, replacing Rashed Eisa.

Shabab Al-Ahli
He was playing with Al-Shabab and after merging Al Ahli, Al-Shabab and Dubai clubs under the name Shabab Al-Ahli Club he was joined to Shabab Al-Ali.

External links

References

1997 births
Living people
Emirati footballers
Al Shabab Al Arabi Club Dubai players
Shabab Al-Ahli Club players
UAE Pro League players
Association football forwards
Place of birth missing (living people)